Nurmyrat Saryhanow (also transliterated as Sarykhanov: , Nurmurat Sarykhanov; 1906 – 1944) was a Soviet Turkmen short story writer and novelist.

Biography
Saryhanow was born to a poor Turkmen family in the village of Geok-Tepe in the Russian Empire's Transcaspian Region (now in Turkmenistan) in 1906.

Educated at Soviet schools after the Russian Revolution, he graduated from Tashkent's Central Asian Communist University. He served in the Red Army as a military journalist from 1929 to 1937 and became known his short stories, devoted to life in Soviet Turkmenistan. His well-received novel Şükür bagşy appeared in 1941.

Saryhanow returned to the Red Army to serve in World War II after the German invasion of the Soviet Union and died in the war in 1944.

His works were translated into the Russian language and were anthologized in both languages during the post-war period.

References

External links
 Nurmyrat Saryhanow in the Great Soviet Encyclopedia 

1906 births
1944 deaths
People from Ahal Region
People from Transcaspian Oblast
Soviet journalists
Male journalists
Soviet military personnel killed in World War II
Soviet novelists
Soviet male writers
20th-century male writers
Soviet short story writers
20th-century short story writers
20th-century Turkmenistan writers
20th-century journalists